Step by Step or Un honnête commerçant is a 2002 Belgium comedy - thriller film directed by Philippe Blasband.

Plot 
The police question Hubert Verkamen, suspected of killing his entire family. This one may well stand as an honest merchant, the cops know well that he is nothing but a dangerous drug dealer. Having never managed to wedge him, they rejoiced to finally have the opportunity to stop him and try by all means to make him talk, to have to wear. But nothing work, handling is not where it was expected.

Cast 

 Benoît Verhaert as Hubert Verkamen
 Philippe Noiret as Louis Chevalier
 Yolande Moreau as Inspector Chantal Bex
 Frédéric Bodson as Inspector Jean Denoote
 Serge Larivière as Inspector Patrice Mercier
 Patrick Hastert as Raoul
 Olindo Bolzan as Jean-François Samson
 Michel Bogen as Jean-Louis
 Michel Kacenelenbogen as Jean-Louis
 Nathalie Laroche as Nadine Verkamen
 Nicolas Combe as Francis
 Rachid Benbouchta as Person
 Belen Montoro as Madame Samson
 Lucas Van den Eynde as The Dutchman

Production
The movie was screened to Montreal World Film Festival (Canada), Venice Film Festival (Italy), Rouen Nordic Film Festival (France), Cognac Film Festival (France) and Zlín Film Festival (Czech Republic).

Accolades

References

External links 

2002 films
Belgian comedy thriller films
2000s comedy thriller films
2002 comedy films